Peschany is a rural locality (a settlement) in Navlinsky District, Bryansk Oblast, Russia. The population was 18 as of 2010. There is 1 street.

Geography 
Peschany is located 20 km northwest of Navlya (the district's administrative centre) by road. Cheryomushki and Purvinka are the nearest rural localities.

References 

Rural localities in Navlinsky District